Isaac R. Harrington (December 7, 1789 - August 20, 1851) was a prominent businessman and entrepreneur in Burlington, Vermont and Buffalo, New York.  He became active in politics as a Whig and served as mayor of Buffalo from 1841 to 1842.

Early life
Isaac Russell (or Russel) Harrington was born in New Haven, Connecticut on December 7, 1789.  Harrington's mother was Hannah (Upson) Harrington (1763-1840). His father was Benjamin Harrington (1762-1810), a prominent citizen of Shelburne, Vermont, who served several terms in the Vermont House of Representatives.  Benjamin Harrington was a native of Connecticut and commanded ships on ocean voyages before moving to Shelburne, which resulted in Shelburne residents frequently referring to him as "Captain Harrington".

In 1793, Benjamin Harrington moved his family to Shelburne, where Isaac Harrington was raised and educated.  He graduated from the University of Vermont in 1809.  During the War of 1812, Harrington served as a private in the 1st Regiment (Judson's) of the Vermont Militia.

Harrington became active in several business ventures in Burlington, including a store where he sold dry goods, groceries, hardware and housewares.  He also bought and sold other items when he had the opportunity, including horses, farms, and barrels of beer.  In 1816, Harrington became the proprietor of a Burlington inn and hotel, which he purchased from Joseph King.

Another early Isaac Harrington business venture was operating the Phoenix, a Lake Champlain steamship which made regular trips to and from Whitehall, New York and Saint-Jean-sur-Richelieu, Quebec.  Harrington was the ship's sailing master, and as a result was frequently addressed as "Captain Harrington", as his father had been.  He left Vermont in about 1830 and moved to Buffalo, New York; an 1832 letter by a Vermonter traveling to Cleveland, Ohio was published in a Burlington newspaper, which indicated that the author had stayed at the Eagle Tavern in Buffalo, of which Harrington was the proprietor.

Career in Buffalo
In addition to Harrington's business career in Buffalo, he became active in the city's local government.  In the mid-1830s, he was appointed to several commissions that assessed property owners in order to finance improvements to several Buffalo streets.  The owners were required to pay based on the value the improvements would add to their homes and businesses.  In Buffalo, Harrington was popularly known as "Cuff" or "Old Cuff", but the origin of the nickname is not known.

Harrington was also involved in Buffalo-area politics as a member of the Whig Party.  In 1836 he was a delegate to the party's 8th New York State Senate District Convention.  In 1840, Harrington was a candidate for alderman from Buffalo's fifth ward.  He was elected, and took his seat in March.  Though he was a Whig, in 1841 Harrington entered the race for mayor against the party's preferred candidate, Ira A. Blossom.  Harrington was supported by most of Buffalo's Democrats and defeated Blossom.  In March, 1841 he succeeded Sheldon Thompson as mayor.  He served until March 1842, when he was defeated for reelection by George W. Clinton.  Among the initiatives Harrington undertook as mayor was an effort to persuade New York's state government to fund improvements to the Erie Canal, which were intended to ensure that Buffalo-area shipping could continue during periods when the water level of Lake Erie receded.

After leaving the mayor's office, Harrington continued his involvement in Whig politics.  He supported Henry Clay for president in 1844, and attended Whig party meetings to organize the Clay campaign in New York. Harrington supported the presidential campaign of Zachary Taylor in the election of 1848.  Taylor won and Harrington was one of the honorary managers of a February 1849 Whig inaugural ball held in Buffalo.

Harrington's support for the Whig Party was recognized in May 1849, when he was appointed as postmaster of Buffalo, succeeding Henry K. Smith.  He continued to serve in this position until his death, and was succeeded by James O. Putnam.  Harrington became ill in the summer of 1851 and died at his home in Buffalo on August 20.  He was buried at Forest Lawn Cemetery in Buffalo.

Electoral history
Election for mayor of Buffalo, 1842

George W. Clinton, 1462 (61%)
Isaac R. Harrington, 909 (39%)

Election for mayor of Buffalo, 1841

Isaac R. Harrington, 1122 (52%)
Ira A. Blossom, 996 (48%)

Election for Alderman from Buffalo's Fifth Ward, 1840

Isaac R. Harrington, 221 (31.5%)
Peter Curtiss, 205 (29.2%)
A. Q. Stebbins, 170 (24.2%)
Henry Roop, 105 (15.0%)

Family
In 1810, Harrington married Amanda Lyman (1790-1874) in Burlington.  They were the parents of six children -- Edmund, Laura, Juliet, Charles, Donald, and Marion.

Notes

References

Sources

Internet

Books

Newspapers

External links

1789 births
1851 deaths
People from Shelburne, Vermont
Politicians from Burlington, Vermont
University of Vermont alumni
American militiamen in the War of 1812
19th-century American politicians
New York (state) Whigs
Mayors of Buffalo, New York
New York (state) postmasters
Burials at Forest Lawn Cemetery (Buffalo)